Knud Schrøder (28 July 1903 – 15 December 1976) was a Danish film actor. He appeared in 23 films between 1944 and 1965. He was born and died in Denmark.

Filmography

 Jensen længe leve (1965)
 En ven i bolignøden (1965)
 Kampen om Næsbygård (1964)
 Premiere i helvede (1964)
 Der brænder en ild (1962)
 Rikki og mændene (1962)
 Det skete på Møllegården (1960)
 Forelsket i København (1960)
 Helle for Helene (1959)
 Far til fire og ulveungerne (1958)
 Seksdagesløbet (1958)
 Tag til marked i Fjordby (1957)
 Der var engang en gade (1957)
 Ingen tid til kærtegn (1957)
 Far til fire i byen (1956)
 Den kloge mand (1956)
 Min datter Nelly (1955)
 Ved kongelunden... (1953)
 Det store løb (1952)
 Vejrhanen (1952)
 Café Paradis (1950)
 Den opvakte jomfru (1950)
 Elly Petersen (1944)

External links

1903 births
1976 deaths
Danish male film actors
20th-century Danish male actors

References